Henry Manning was a spy in the exiled court of Charles II at Cologne and Brussels. He reported back to John Thurloe, Cromwell's chief of counter-espionage. He was unmasked as a mole in 1655, prosecuted and executed by firing squad.

References

English spies
Executed spies
Cavaliers
Executed British people
People executed under the Interregnum (England) by firing squad
Year of death missing
Year of birth missing
Executed English people
17th-century spies